

1820 Atlantic hurricane season
1) The Winyaw Hurricane of 1820 A minimal hurricane moved from Florida on September 8 northward to hit near the border of North Carolina and South Carolina on September 10. It caused only minor damage. Part of cluster of hurricanes struck Charleston area in 1804, 1811, 1813, 1820, and 1822.

2) A hurricane was sighted at Dominica on September 26 before moving west-northwest through Hispaniola, then across the southwest Atlantic to South Carolina on October 1.

1821 Atlantic hurricane season
1) A tropical storm moved westward across the Caribbean, from Guadeloupe on September 1 to western Cuba on September 9.

2) The Norfolk and Long Island Hurricane of 1821

The Norfolk and Long Island Hurricane was a deadly hurricane that rapidly moved up the Atlantic coast during the first few days of September. It included a hurricane landfall within the modern borders of New York City, the only recorded case of a hurricane eyewall moving directly over New York City to date. It caused 200 deaths, and is estimated to have been a Category 4 hurricane.

3) The Middle Gulf Hurricane of 1821 Later in September, from the 15th–17th, a strong hurricane hit Mississippi. This was a very large storm, bringing storm surge flooding from Mobile to what is now Wakulla and Taylor Counties, Florida. 11 of the 13 vessels in the harbor at Pensacola Bay were lost, causing 35 deaths.

It was from the 1821 Norfolk and Long Island hurricane that William C. Redfield published his account in the American Journal of Science presenting his first evidence that hurricanes had counter-clockwise rotation of destructive winds from area tree fall patterns he examined. This also corroborated John Farrar's published work a few years earlier in 1819 that a hurricane was a rotating counter-clockwise vortex. Redfield suggested that hurricanes form east of the Leeward Islands and then travel westwards at a moderate speed. William Reid of the Royal Engineers built off of Redfield's work by studying logs of ships affected by the Great Hurricane of 1780.

1822 Atlantic hurricane season
1) The Early Tropical Storm of 1822 A hurricane struck the central Gulf coast between July 7 and July 9.

2) The Carolina Hurricane of 1822 This hurricane moved north-northwest from the Bahamas on September 25 to hit Charleston, South Carolina, on September 27. It claimed the lives of hundreds of slaves who found themselves trapped in the low-lying Santee Delta, miles from higher ground and with no shelter. It caused 300 (or more deaths), but managed to break a drought in the Richmond area. Part of cluster of hurricanes struck Charleston area in 1804, 1811, 1813, 1820, and 1822. Fifteen members of the Myers family drowned after their Georgetown home was swept into the ocean. The family's sole survivor, Mordecai Myers, buried the victims, which included his parents.

3) From October 20 to the 22, a hurricane hit Virginia, causing heavy damage and winds in the Richmond area.

4) A hurricane struck the River Mersey in England on December 56, as evidenced by the gravestone of Nelson Burt (nine-year-old son of Albin R. Burt) in the churchyard of St Lawrence's Church, Stoak.

5) A rare December hurricane moved through the eastern Caribbean Sea and eventually into Venezuela between December 13 and December 22.

1823 Atlantic hurricane season
1) A tropical storm moved from Curaçao on July 8 to near Jamaica on July 10.

2) A tropical storm moved south of Jamaica on August 2 and August 3.

3) A hurricane which formed in the west-central Gulf of Mexico on September 11 moved slowly northeast, striking the central Gulf coast on September 14.

1824 Atlantic hurricane season
1) The Georgia Coastal Hurricane of 1824 or Hurricane San Pedro of 1824. A severe hurricane was sighted at Guadeloupe on September 7 and moved across the northeast Lesser Antilles. It passed very near south coast of Puerto Rico on September 9 and the southwest Atlantic to hit Florida on September 13, passing inland near Cape Florida and returning to sea near Cape Canaveral. A ship carrying the contractor and supplies for building three lighthouses in Florida was lost, possibly sunk by this storm.  The storm then went ashore in Georgia and South Carolina on September 14, causing 100 deaths. It washed out all bridges between Darien and Savannah. Moving northward, it hit Savannah and South Carolina before going out to sea. Because hurricanes were somewhat frequent, residents were used to evacuating the area. Those who did not evacuate saw the destruction caused by this strong hurricane. This is likely one of the strongest hurricanes to hit Georgia in its history.

2) Between September 26 and September 27, a tropical storm moved south of Jamaica.

1825 Atlantic hurricane season
1) Charleston Hurricane of 1825. A tropical storm formed south of Santo Domingo on May 28. It moved across Cuba on the 1st, and while moving across Florida it caused heavy winds. When it reached the western Atlantic it rapidly strengthened, hitting Charleston as a hurricane, but it lost strength over the northwestern Atlantic Ocean.

2) On July 6, a moderate hurricane hit Puerto Rico, destroying 6 villages.

3) Hurricane Santa Ana of 1825. Two weeks later, on July 26, a powerful hurricane hit near Guadeloupe. It continued west-northwestward to hit Puerto Rico, causing 1,300 deaths, before tracking to the west of Bermuda by August 2. The Santa Ana hurricane may have been one of the most intense cyclones to strike Puerto Rico in the last few hundred years. See List of deadliest Atlantic hurricanes.

4) A hurricane struck Haiti on September 28 and moved northwestward into northeast Florida by October 3.

5) On November 17–18, the schooner Harvest was wrecked on the North Carolina coast, probably near Nags Head, and five or more persons killed in what may have been a late season hurricane.

1826 Atlantic hurricane season

1) A hurricane hit the Cayman Islands and western Cuba on August 27, causing 33 deaths.

2) A tropical storm spotted near Dominica on August 31 moved west-northwest to Jamaica before moving northward to the Grand Banks by September 10.

3) Heavy cyclone devastated la Orotava valley, Tenerife, Canary Islands in November. About 500 – 1000 victims.

1827 Atlantic hurricane season
1) Tropical Storm San Jacinto of 1827 A hurricane struck Antigua and Puerto Rico on August 17, and moved westward to Jamaica before continuing westward to Vera Cruz, Mexico.

2) The Great North Carolina Hurricane of 1827

A hurricane formed over the Windward Islands on August 18. It moved northwest through the Bahamas on the 21st, and hit Cape Hatteras on August 24. It moved up the Chesapeake Bay, causing higher than normal tides, and eventually through New England by August 27. This is known as the St. Kitts Hurricane.

3) A hurricane struck Belize City on August 19, 1827, and “drove all ships on shore at Belize.” It has been identified as ‘Event 5’ in Belizean sedimentary records by McCloskey and Keller.

4) A tropical storm moved through the southwest Atlantic between the West Indies and Bermuda from August 29 to September 8.

1828 Atlantic hurricane season
1) A hurricane moved from the northern Lesser Antilles on September 15 northward by Bermuda on September 19, where it caused a "severe gale" and sank 3 ships, before moving into the north Atlantic shipping lanes.

1829 Atlantic hurricane season
1) A tropical storm moved through the Gulf of Mexico between July 9 and July 13.

2) A strong tropical storm moved through South Carolina and the Outer Banks of North Carolina before moving northwest of Bermuda during the last week of August.

3) On September 10, a hurricane hit the mouth of the Rio Grande. Port Isabel and Brazos Santiago saw great destruction, while other towns had higher than normal tides.

4) A hurricane hit Saint Bartholomew on October 26, possibly sinking one ship.

See also

List of tropical cyclones
Atlantic hurricane season

References

World Wide Web

Books
Terry Tucker. Beware the Hurricane! The Story of the Gyratory Tropical Storms That Have Struck Bermuda. Bermuda: Hamilton Press, 1966, p. 87–89.

External links
https://web.archive.org/web/20051225012719/http://www.wavy.com/Global/story.asp?S=90814
https://web.archive.org/web/20051124024153/http://www.lbi.net/rlw/hurrican.asp
http://www.nhc.noaa.gov/pastdeadlyapp1.shtml
http://www.wpc.ncep.noaa.gov/research/roth/vaerly19hur.htm
http://www.wpc.ncep.noaa.gov/research/txhur.pdf
http://www.wpc.ncep.noaa.gov/research/lahur.pdf
http://www.candoo.com/genresources/hurricane.htm

 
1820s